Miler may refer to:

Given name
Miler Magrath (1523–1622), Irish priest and archbishop born in County Fermanagh, Ireland
Miler O'Higgin (died 1590), Irish Roman Catholic clergyman

Surname
Johnny Miler (1910–1976), United States Olympic boxer
Phil Miler, Brazilian actor and an internationally awarded voice actor
Zdeněk Miler (1921–2011), Czech animator and illustrator

Industry
Miler Coaster, a family-owned roller coaster manufacturing firm based in Portland, Oregon, United States
Prince Miler, medium-sized pickup truck built by the Prince Motor Company

Others
Miler language, a language spoken in central Nigeria

See also
Mailer (disambiguation)
Miller
Miller's (disambiguation)
Millers (disambiguation)
Millery (disambiguation)
Smiler (disambiguation)